Wladimiro Panizza (5 June 1945 – 21 May 2002) was an Italian professional road bicycle racer. Panizza came from a Communist family and was named after Lenin. During his long career (1967–1985), he helped Felice Gimondi and Franco Bitossi. His best grand tour was the 1980 Giro d'Italia, where he placed second in the overall classification. He holds the record for participation in the Giro, completing the race 16 times out of 18 starts.

Major results

1967
 1st GP Montelupo
 1st GP Hiussano
 1st GP Valsassina
 1st GP Robbiano
 4th Giro di Lombardia
1968
 2nd Coppa Sabatini
 3rd Gran Premio Industria e Commercio di Prato
1969
 3rd Giro di Campania
1970
 1st GP Monaco
 2nd Tour du Haut Var
 9th Overall Tour de Romandie
1971
 3rd Trofeo Laigueglia
 5th Overall Tour de Romandie
 9th Overall Giro d'Italia
1972
 3rd GP Montelupo
 3rd Giro del Piemonte
 3rd Gran Premio Città di Camaiore
 5th Overall Giro d'Italia
1973
 1st Giro della Provincia di Reggio Calabria
 1st Giro della Romagna
 3rd Overall Tour de Suisse
 3rd Giro del Veneto
 5th Overall Volta a Catalunya
1st Stage 4b
 6th Overall Giro d'Italia
1974
 2nd Giro di Campania
 2nd Overall Tour de Romandie
1st Stage 1
 3rd Overall A Travers Lausanne
 4th Overall Tour de France
 4th Liège–Bastogne–Liège
1975
 1st  National Cyclo-cross Championships
 1st Milano–Torino
 2nd Giro di Campania
 3rd Overall Tirreno–Adriatico
 3rd Giro del Veneto
 6th Overall Giro d'Italia:
1st Stage 17b
 8th Giro di Lombardia
 10th Liège–Bastogne–Liège
1976
 1st  National Cyclo-cross Championships
 1st Stage 15 Tour de France
 1st Stage 1 Giro di Sardegna
 2nd Milan–San Remo
 3rd Giro di Lombardia
 3rd National Road Race Championships
 6th Overall Giro d'Italia
1977
 1st Grand Prix du Midi Libre
 2nd Coppa Bernocchi
 2nd Trittico Lombardo
 3rd Giro dell'Appennino
 5th Overall Giro d'Italia
 5th Giro di Lombardia
1978
 2nd Giro di Campania
 2nd Giro dell'Emilia
 2nd Trofeo Pantalica
 2nd Trittico Lombardo
 3rd Giro di Puglia
 3rd Coppa Bernocchi
 4th Overall Giro d'Italia
1st Stage 17
 4th Giro di Lombardia
1979
 1st Stage 1 Tirreno–Adriatico
 2nd Gran Premio Industria e Commercio di Prato
 2nd Giro del Piemonte
 3rd Milano–Torino
 3rd Giro della Provincia di Reggio Calabria
 8th Overall Tour de Romandie
1980
 1st Stage 1 Tour de Romandie
 1st Giro della Provincia di Siracusa
 2nd Overall Giro d'Italia
 2nd Giro del Piemonte
 2nd Coppa Agostoni
 2nd Coppa Placci
 2nd Giro dell'Emilia
 3rd Overall Étoile de Bessèges
 4th Road race, UCI World Road Championships
 9th Giro di Lombardia
1981
 1st Giro del Friuli
 2nd National Road Race Championships
 2nd Trofeo Pantalica
 3rd Giro dell'Appennino
1982
 1st Giro della Provincia di Siracusa
 1st Trofeo dell'Etna
 3rd Trofeo Laigueglia
 3rd Giro di Campania
 5th Züri-Metzgete
1983
 3rd Giro dell'Appennino
 10th Overall Giro d'Italia
1984
 3rd Giro dell'Appennino

Grand Tour general classification results timeline

References

External links 

Official Tour de France results for Wladimiro Panizza

Italian male cyclists
1945 births
2002 deaths
Italian Tour de France stage winners
Cyclo-cross cyclists
Italian Giro d'Italia stage winners
Cyclists from the Province of Varese